Echo of Miles: Scattered Tracks Across the Path is a 3-CD compilation album by the American rock band Soundgarden. It was released on November 24, 2014. The album is a collection of rarities, live tracks, and unreleased material spanning the group's history. It includes previously released songs, such as "Live to Rise", "Black Rain", "Birth Ritual", and others, as well as a newly recorded rendition of a song from the band's pre-Matt Cameron 1985 demo, "The Storm", now simply titled "Storm", which was produced by Jack Endino.

While almost fully comprehensive, there are some notable absentees from this compilation: "Incessant Mace" from 1986's Pyrrhic Victory compilation cassette (with Chris Cornell on drums), "Heretic" and "Tears to Forget" from 1986's Deep Six compilation (with Scott Sundquist on drums), and a re-recording of "New Damage" featuring Brian May from 1993's Alternative NRG compilation.

Kim Thayil has also mentioned in past interviews that there are more unreleased tracks that still have not seen the light of day. None of these tracks are on Echo of Miles, despite the fact that Thayil has expressed that he wanted to release a b-sides compilation featuring these tracks. Deluxe editions of the band's studio albums Ultramega OK, Badmotorfinger, and Superunknown were released between 2014 and 2017. All three contained demo rehearsals, remixes, alternate versions, or outtakes, some of which did not appear on Echo of Miles.

Track listing
Disc one - Originals

Disc two - Covers

Disc three - Oddities

The Originals (Single Disc version)

Chart performance

Personnel
Soundgarden
Chris Cornell – lead vocals, rhythm guitar
Kim Thayil – lead guitar
Ben Shepherd – bass on tracks 5-18 (Originals); bass on tracks 6-15 (Covers); bass on tracks 2-5,7,8,11-13 (Oddities)
Matt Cameron – drums
Hiro Yamamoto – bass on tracks 1–4 (Originals); bass on tracks 1–4 (Covers); bass on tracks 1,6,9,10,14 (Oddities)
Jason Everman – bass on tracks 5,16,17 (Covers)

Additional musicians
Stephanie (Barber) Fairweather – lead vocals on track 9 (Covers)

Notes

References

External links
 AllMusic review

2014 compilation albums
Soundgarden compilation albums
Albums produced by Jack Endino